Most of the Manchu clans took on their Han surnames after the demise of the Qing dynasty. Several clans took on Han identity as early as in the Ming dynasty period. The surnames were derived from the Chinese meaning of their original clan name, Chinese transliteration of the clan's name, the possessed territories, generation and personal names of the clansmen and also inspired by the surnames taken by related clans and branches. Only the few clans have origins dating back to Jurchen-led Jin dynasty. The majority has their origin dating back to the Ming dynasty or the Qing dynasty. The clans were also formed from the cadet branches of the elder or more prominent ones. Most of the clans had Mongol, Daur, Uighur, Han, Korean or Evenk descent. The following tables contain the list of the surnames taken by the Manchu clans.

A

B

C

D

E

F

G

H

I

J

K

L

M

N

P

R

S

T

U

W

Y

References

Notes

Manchu clans
Manchu culture